Monastère Bénédictin Sainte-Marie, Bouaké, Côte d'Ivoire, is a Benedictine monastery of the Subiaco Congregation. Established in 1960, by the year 2000 the monastery was home to eight monks. The community is under the leadership of Prior Administrator Fr Jean Décoville.

History
On December 7, 1959, three monks from the Benedictine monastery of Toumliline, Morocco, arrived in Côte d'Ivoire. By April 12 of the following year, Monastère Bénédictin Sainte-Marie had been canonically established. The monastery was raised to the status of a simple priory on February 7, 1975.

The monks of Bouaké have supported themselves by raising chickens and producing yoghurt. The monastery maintains high visibility in Bouaké by providing facilities for retreatants.

Personnel
As of 2000, the community at Bouaké included eight monks, three of whom were ordained priests. The monks of Monastère Bénédictin Sainte-Marie are under the leadership of Prior Administrator Fr Jean Décoville.

See also
Order of Saint Benedict
Subiaco Congregation
Roman Catholicism in Côte d'Ivoire

References

Benedictine monasteries in Africa
Bouaké
Buildings and structures in Vallée du Bandama District
Religious buildings and structures in Ivory Coast
1960 establishments in Ivory Coast